Broadway Department Store Building may refer to:
 Broadway Hollywood Building
 Broadway Department Store Downtown Los Angeles Building